Red moon may refer to:

 Red moon, the color of the Moon in a complete lunar eclipse
 Red moon, another name for a full moon

Red Moon may also refer to:

Film and TV
 Red Moon (1951 film) (Italian Luna rossa), a 1951 film
 Red Moon (2001 film) (Italian Luna rossa), a 2001 film
 The Red Moon (film), a 2014 Moroccan film
 The pilot episode of the 2019 TV series For All Mankind

Music
 Red Moon (The Call album), 1990
 Red Moon (Kalafina album), 2010
 Red Moon (Mamamoo EP), 2018
 Red Moon (Kard EP), 2020
 The Red Moon EP, by Turin Brakes, 2005
 "Red Moon", song by Kim Woo-seok, 2020
 Red Moon,  Debrah Scarlett (born 1993), Norwegian-Swiss singer-songwriter

Other uses
 Red Moon (game), a game in the 1988 Time and Magik text adventure games
 Red Moon (software), the Android blue-light filtering app
 Red Moon (novel), a 2018 science fiction novel

See also
 Luna rossa (disambiguation), red moon in Italian
 "Red Moon of Zembabwei", a Conan the Barbarian story by L. Sprague de Camp and Lin Carter in the July 1974 Fantastic